Thu Kamkasomphou (born 12 October 1968) is a Laotian-French para table tennis player. She has won eight Paralympic medals for France.

At the 2000 Summer Paralympics, she captured a gold medal in the class 9 event. At the 2008 Summer Paralympics, she won a gold in the class 8 event by defeating Sweden's Josefin Abrahamsson, three sets to nil.

She has polyarteritis nodosa.

References

External links 
 

1968 births
Living people
French female table tennis players
Table tennis players at the 2000 Summer Paralympics
Table tennis players at the 2004 Summer Paralympics
Table tennis players at the 2008 Summer Paralympics
Table tennis players at the 2012 Summer Paralympics
Table tennis players at the 2016 Summer Paralympics
Paralympic table tennis players of France
Medalists at the 2000 Summer Paralympics
Medalists at the 2004 Summer Paralympics
Medalists at the 2008 Summer Paralympics
Medalists at the 2012 Summer Paralympics
Medalists at the 2016 Summer Paralympics
Paralympic medalists in table tennis
Paralympic gold medalists for France
Paralympic silver medalists for France
Paralympic bronze medalists for France
Laotian emigrants to France
Laotian table tennis players
Naturalised table tennis players
Naturalized citizens of France
People from Savannakhet province
20th-century Laotian women
Table tennis players at the 2020 Summer Paralympics